Evgeny Valeryevich Arkhipov (born January 4, 1992) is a Russian curler from Moscow. He currently skips  the Russian national curling team and skips a different rink on the World Curling Tour.

Arkhipov played on the Russian national junior team from 2011 to 2013, skipping the team from 2012 to 2013. The team, which also consisted of Sergey Glukhov, Dmitry Mironov and Artur Ali qualified for the 2013 World Junior Curling Championships where they won a silver medal. The team had finished the round robin with a 7-2 record in third place, and managed to defeat Sweden's Patric Mabergs and Canada's Matthew Dunstone in the playoffs before losing to Scotland's Kyle Smith in the final.

In 2013, Arkhipov joined the national men's team.  His first international tournament on the men's team was the 2013 European Curling Championships, where he threw fourth stones for the team. After finishing the round robin with a 4-4 record, the team finished 6th place. Arkhipov was moved to play third on the team for the 2014 Winter Olympics where the team finished 7th place and a 2-5 record.

Arkhipov has played in one Grand Slam event, the 2013 Masters of Curling as a member of the Russian men's team. Arkhipov threw fourth stones in the tournament, and the team went 0-4.

Personal life
Arkhipov attended the Russian State University of Physical Education.

External links
 
 Olympic profile 

Russian male curlers
Curlers from Saint Petersburg
Living people
1992 births
Curlers at the 2014 Winter Olympics
Olympic curlers of Russia
Curlers from Moscow
Universiade medalists in curling
Universiade silver medalists for Russia
Competitors at the 2015 Winter Universiade